(Catharine) Jan Morris  (born James Humphry Morris; 2 October 192620 November 2020) was a Welsh historian, author and travel writer. She was known particularly for the Pax Britannica trilogy (1968–1978), a history of the British Empire, and for portraits of cities, including Oxford, Venice, Trieste, Hong Kong and New York City. She published under her birth name, James, until 1972, when she had gender reassignment surgery after transitioning from male to female.

Morris was a member of the 1953 British Mount Everest expedition, which made the first ever confirmed ascent of the mountain. She was the only journalist to accompany the expedition, climbing with the team to a camp at 22,000 feet, and using a prearranged code to send news of the successful ascent, which was announced in The Times on the day of Queen Elizabeth II's coronation (2 June 1953).

Background
Morris was born in Clevedon, Somerset, England, the youngest of three children of Walter Henry Morris (died 1938), an engineer from Monmouth, on the borders of Wales, who never fully recovered after being gassed in the First World War, and Enid (née Payne; died 1981), an English church organist who trained as a concert pianist at the Leipzig Conservatory and was a "well-known recitalist in the early days of broadcasting in south Wales and the west of England". Her elder brothers Gareth (1920–2007) and Christopher (1922–2014) achieved distinction, as a flautist and as an organist and music publisher for the Oxford University Press respectively. Morris was a chorister in the choir of Christ Church Cathedral, Oxford, while boarding at Christ Church Cathedral School. She went on to be educated at Lancing College, returning to Christ Church, Oxford, as an undergraduate, taking a second-class honours BA in 1951 (promoted to the customary Oxford MA in 1961), and editing the Cherwell magazine. Despite being born and largely raised in England, Morris always identified as Welsh. In the closing stages of the Second World War, Morris served in the 9th Queen's Royal Lancers, and in 1945 was posted to the Free Territory of Trieste, during the joint British–American occupation, eventually serving as regimental intelligence officer.

Career

After the war, Morris wrote for The Times and in 1953 was the only journalist accompanying the 1953 British Mount Everest expedition, which included Edmund Hillary and Tenzing Norgay, who were the first to scale Mount Everest. Morris reported the success of Hillary and Tenzing in a coded message to the newspaper, "Snow conditions bad stop advanced base abandoned yesterday stop awaiting improvement", and by coincidence the scoop was published in The Times on the morning of the coronation of Elizabeth II. The message was initially interpreted to mean that Tom Bourdillon and Tenzing had reached the summit, but the first name was corrected before the story was broken. Claims that the news was held back ignore the communication problems of the time; it was quite an achievement to get the news of the 29 May ascent to London by Coronation Day on 2 June, as it had to be sent to Namche Bazaar by runner.

Reporting from Cyprus on the Suez Crisis for the Manchester Guardian in 1956, Morris produced the first "irrefutable proof" of collusion between France and Israel in the invasion of Egyptian territory, interviewing French Air Force pilots who confirmed that they had been in action in support of Israeli forces. She also reported on the 1961 trial of Adolf Eichmann in Jerusalem. Later Morris opposed the Falklands War.

Personal life
In 1949, Morris married Elizabeth, daughter of Ceylon tea planter Austen Cecil Tuckniss; they had five children together, including the poet and musician Twm Morys. One of their children died in infancy. They lived together in the village of Llanystumdwy, in North Wales, for over 50 years until Morris' death in November 2020, first in a large Georgian house, Plas Trefan, and latterly in a converted stable block, Trefan Morys, in the grounds.

Morris began transitioning to life as a woman in 1964, one of the first high-profile people to do so. In 1972, Morris travelled to Morocco to undergo sex reassignment surgery, performed by surgeon Georges Burou, because doctors in Britain refused to allow the procedure unless Morris and Tuckniss divorced, something Morris was not prepared to do. They had to divorce later, but remained together and on 14 May 2008 were legally reunited when they formally entered into a civil partnership. She detailed her transition in Conundrum (1974), her first book under her new name, and one of the first autobiographies to discuss a personal gender reassignment.

Morris died on 20 November 2020 at Ysbyty Bryn Beryl (Bryn Beryl Hospital) in Pwllheli in North Wales, at the age of 94, survived by Elizabeth and their four children. Her death was announced by her son Twm.

Awards
Morris received honorary doctorates from the University of Wales and the University of Glamorgan, was an honorary fellow of Christ Church, Oxford, and was a fellow of the Royal Society of Literature. Morris was elected to the Gorsedd Cymru in 1992; she received the Glyndŵr Award for Outstanding Contribution to the Arts in Wales in 1996. She accepted her CBE in the 1999 Birthday Honours "out of polite respect", but Morris was a Welsh nationalist republican at heart. In 2005, she was awarded the Golden PEN Award by English PEN for "a Lifetime's Distinguished Service to Literature". In January 2008, The Times named her the 15th greatest British writer since the War. She has featured in the Pinc List of leading Welsh LGBT figures. She won the 2018 Edward Stanford Outstanding Contribution to Travel Writing Award.

In an interview with BBC in 2016, she told Michael Palin that she did not like to be described as a travel writer, as her books are not about movement and journeys; they are about places and people.

Works

Morris's 1974 best-selling memoir Conundrum documented her transition and was compared to that of transgender pioneer Christine Jorgensen (A Personal Autobiography).  Later memoirs included Herstory and Pleasures of a Tangled Life.  She also wrote many essays on travel and her life, and published a collection of her diary entries as In My Mind's Eye in 2019.

Morris wrote many books on travel, particularly about Venice and Trieste. Her Pax Britannica trilogy, on the history of the British Empire, received praise.  Morris' 1985 novel Last Letters from Hav, an "imagined travelogue and political thriller" was shortlisted for that year's Booker Prize.

In 1995, Morris completed a biography of First Sea Lord John Fisher, 1st Baron Fisher entitled Fisher's Face. She began researching the life of the Admiral in the 1950s, describing the several-decades-long project as a "jeu d’amour" (love game).

References

Notes

Citations

Further reading
 Derek Johns: Ariel: A Literary Life of Jan Morris, London: Faber & Faber, 2016,

External links

 Jan Morris Blog
 
 Works by Morris at Open Library
 
 
Last Surviving Member of 1953 Everest Expedition Passes Away

1926 births
2020 deaths
20th-century Welsh historians
20th-century Welsh novelists
20th-century Welsh women writers
21st-century Welsh historians
21st-century Welsh novelists
21st-century Welsh women writers
21st-century Welsh writers
9th Queen's Royal Lancers officers
Alumni of Christ Church, Oxford
British Army personnel of World War II
Welsh women historians
Commanders of the Order of the British Empire
Fellows of the Royal Society of Literature
Harkness Fellows
Historians of the British Empire
Historians of Wales
Welsh transgender people
Transgender memoirists
Welsh LGBT novelists
People educated at Lancing College
The Guardian journalists
The Times journalists
Transgender women
Transgender academics
People from Clevedon
Welsh memoirists
Welsh nationalists
Welsh novelists
Welsh republicans
Welsh travel writers
British women memoirists
Welsh people of English descent
British women journalists
People of the Suez Crisis
British women travel writers
Welsh women novelists
Transgender novelists